Walkerville is a village in Gauteng, South Africa, about  south of Johannesburg on the R82 road.

References

External links
 Walkerville Website

Populated places in the Midvaal Local Municipality